Michael Marai (1948 – November 3, 2021) was a Papua New Guinean Roman Catholic prelate and bishop emeritus of Goroka. He served as the Bishop of the Roman Catholic Diocese of Goroka from 1988 until in 1994.

Marai was born in 1948 on Mushu Island, Territory of Papua and New Guinea, in present-day East Sepik Province, Papua New Guinea. He was ordained as a Roman Catholic priest on December 6, 1976. He was appointed Bishop of the Diocese of Goroka on October 25, 1988. Marai served as the bishop until he stepped down on November 15, 1994.

Marai died from cancer at the Wirui Retirement House in Wewak, Papua New Guinea, on November 3, 2021, at the age of 73. His funeral mass was held at the Wirui Sound Shell in Wirui on November 16, 2021. He was buried in Wirui Cemetery alongside other PNG bishops, including Leo Arkfeld and Cherubim Dambui.

References

1948 births
2021 deaths
Roman Catholic bishops of Goroka
Papua New Guinean Roman Catholic bishops
Bishops appointed by Pope John Paul II
People from East Sepik Province
People from the Eastern Highlands Province